The Fuji GX680 is a series of single lens reflex system cameras for medium format film produced by Fujifilm with interchangeable camera lenses and interchangeable film holders for the unusual film format 6×8 cm on 120 and 220 roll film. The distinguishing feature of the Fuji GX680 is the articulating front standard, which runs on a rail connecting lens and camera body by a bellows; the interchangeable lens is permanently mounted to a lens board.

In contrast to competing medium-format cameras, e.g. Mamiya RB67 and RZ67 and Rolleiflex SL66, for some models of the Fuji GX680 the front standard can be shifted right, left, up and down for perspective control, and the front standard can also be tilted on horizontal and vertical axes to control depth of field using the Scheimpflug principle. Therefore, the Fuji GX680 has many of the same camera movements of a large format view camera, only limited by restricted motions of the front standard and a fixed rear standard, making the camera also suitable for architectural photography. The Fuji GX680 has quite large physical dimensions for a medium-format camera, but compared to the typical monorail/studio large-format camera, the Fuji GX680 is more compact. Although the Fuji GX680 was designed for studio work due to its size and weight, a neck-strap was offered for mobile work.

Camera models
The Fuji GX680 has been built in 3 model variants (numbers in parentheses are the production periods):
 Fuji GX680 (1987–1995)
 Fuji GX680 II (1995–1998)
 Fuji GX680 III (1998–2007)
The 3 models differ externally only by slight modifications on displays, controls and rechargeable battery versus battery. The GX680 was introduced in 1987, and shown at the Photographic Marketing Association convention with nine lenses, which was held in Chicago. The original GX680 and GX680 II are powered by a rechargeable nickel-cadmium battery, which provides sufficient power for approximately 1000 exposures and recharges in 1 hour. Alternatively, for studio use, an optional DC power supply is available. Externally, the original may be distinguished from model II by the focus locking mechanism. The focusing knob operated by the right hand has a "focus brake" lever coaxial with the focus knob on the original camera, while the same function is performed by a "focus lock lever" that is on the front standard carrier on the model II. The III/IIIS has the name prominently marked on the right side of the camera, above the shutter speed selector dial.

There is a second (Simplified) variant of the model III denoted with an "S" suffix (e.g., GX680 IIIS) which only allows linear extension of the front standard along the rails, and omits the tilt and shift movements of the standard model. In return, the IIIS is  lighter than the regular model III.

The Fuji GX680 system features interchangeable camera lenses, viewfinders and focusing screens, film holders (also for instant film), batteries, and bellows including the standard bellows, bag bellows for wide angle lenses and extended long bellows for telephoto lenses over 150mm. Optional accessories include 50mm extension rail sets for close ups, a remote release, viewfinder correction lenses, neck strap, and bellows lens shades.  Fuji produced a digital back for the GX680 but it was only available in Japan.  In the US, Fuji partnered with the makers of the Luma digital back in the early 2000's.

The film holders for the GX680 and GX680 II feature a backup ER-3 lithium battery to retain data.

Notes

Parts and controls 

The listed controls and parts are available on the camera:
Controls on the right-hand side of the camera body:
 Shutter release button
 Power off & film advance (Single/Continuous/Multi) mode selector
 Film wind button (following a multi-exposure)
 Mirror up/down switch
 Shutter speed selector dial (including Bulb and Auto Exposure)
 Flash synchro socket
 Flash synchro test button
 Remote control shutter release socket
 Communications connector (only on model III)

Controls on the left-hand side of the camera body:
 Battery lock button (model I/II only)
 Side Cover Lock Release button (model III only)
 Battery interface (model I/II only)
 Battery Holder III interface (model III only)

Controls on the top of the body:
 Spirit level
 Viewfinder lock release lever
 LEDs or LCD (post-exposure monitoring)

Controls on the bottom of the body:
 Battery compartment (model III only)

Controls on the back of the body:
 Revolving film-holder lock release button

Controls on the lens:
 Aperture selector lever
 Aperture stop-down (depth-of-field preview) lever

Controls on the front standard:
 Focusing knobs and Focus lock lever
 Tilt, Shift, and Swing knobs and locks
 Hot shoe (on front standard)
 Lens lock lever

Lenses 
All EBC Fujinon GX(M) Lenses have been equipped with a Central shutter (Flash synchronisation is possible at all shutter-speeds), the lenses have good reputations. Electric contacts on the lens board and the lenses are used to control the central shutter from the camera body. The shutter in all lenses is electronic and made by Seiko. Levers on the lens control the aperture.

A Lens Board Adapter accessory permits the use of large-format camera lenses fitting Linhof Technika type lens boards, but the shutter of these lenses is not controlled by the Fuji GX680, so they must be pre-focussed and then manually triggered after the mirror is locked up. The adapter is intended for use with Fujinon-W 180, 210, 250mm; Fujinon-SF 180mm; Fujinon-A 180, 240; and Fujinon-T 300mm lenses.

Accessories 
As the Fuji GX680 series are system cameras there is a wide range of accessories:
 Viewfinders:
 Folding waist level viewfinder (default), including a pop-up 2.5× magnifier with -1 diopter lens
 Alternative 2.5× magnifier lenses were available for the waist level finder with different diopter powers: -4, -3, 0, +1, +2, +3
 "Magnifying Hood" (waist level, equipped with a 4× loupe that can be moved over the focusing screen area)
 Angle Finder (eye-level viewing, adjustable diopter)
 AE viewfinders - each equipped with centre-weighted Exposure Meter (including flash), enabling aperture priority autoexposure:
 "AE Finder FL" (waist level, view from above)
 "AE Finder III" (eye-level, adjustable diopter)
 Focusing Screens (especially for different formats on model III)
 Carrying:
 Neck-strap (model III default accessory) & Neck-strap-set
 Carrying Case
 Backs/Image capture:
 Instant film-holder
 120/220 Roll Film Holder
 Film Holder III (introduced with GX680 III) adds interchangeable masks for 6×4.5, 6×6, and 6×7 formats (along with default 6×8 format with no mask) and adjusts the film advance accordingly; the masks must be installed prior to mounting the back on the body, and the format cannot be changed mid-roll. Single model of film holder used with two different interchangeable film-cassettes for 120 and 220 type film.
 Digital Back Fujifilm DBP for GX680
 Mosaic Engineering Luma / Luma II (digital backs with a  sensor; resolution is 3072×2048 (Luma) or 4008×2672 (Luma II); requires host computer)
 Film-Holder Adaptors for Hasselblad 6×6, Contax 645 and Mamiya 645 backs (other makers digital backs can also be mounted to Fuji GX680 by interchangeable mounts, most digital backs have smaller formats than 6×4.5 format)
 Miscellaneous:
 Extension Rail Sets to extend the standard (65mm) Focus-Rail
 40mm
 80mm (introduced with GX680 II) 
 Bellows for long focus-movement or wide angle-lenses
 1m and 5m Remote Release
 Bellows-Lens-Shades, Lens-Hoods
 Rechargeable Battery, Charger, Battery Holder

Gallery

See also
Fujifilm Barcode System

Notes

References

Further reading

External links 
 The perfect landscape camera?
 Fuji GX680 as view camera (german)
 Beschreibung Fuji GX680 III
 Reviews of Fuji GX680 III - Part 1
 Reviews of Fuji GX680 III - Part 2
 Description & Specification of Fuji GX680 III
 Fujifilm DBP Digital Back

Fujifilm SLR cameras
120 film cameras